Hradecký (feminine Hradecká) is a surname. Notable people with the surname include:

 Ambrož Hradecký, Czech priest
 Lukáš Hrádecký, Slovak-Finnish footballer
 Matej Hradecky, Slovak-Finnish footballer
 Tomas Hradecký, Slovak-Finnish footballer
 Lucie Hradecká, Czech tennis player

See also
Hradecky Bridge, Bridge in Slovenia

Czech-language surnames
Slovak-language surnames